Glucuronyl-galactosyl-proteoglycan 4-alpha-N-acetylglucosaminyltransferase (alpha-N-acetylglucosaminyltransferase I, alpha1,4-N-acetylglucosaminyltransferase, glucuronosylgalactosyl-proteoglycan 4-alpha-N-acetylglucosaminyltransferase) is an enzyme with systematic name UDP-N-acetyl-D-glucosamine:beta-D-glucuronosyl-(1->3)-beta-D-galactosyl-(1->3)-beta-D-galactosyl-(1->4)-beta-D-xylosyl-proteoglycan 4IV-alpha-N-acetyl-D-glucosaminyltransferase. This enzyme catalyses the following chemical reaction

 UDP-N-acetyl-D-glucosamine + beta-D-glucuronosyl-(1->3)-beta-D-galactosyl-(1->3)-beta-D-galactosyl-(1->4)-beta-D-xylosyl-proteoglycan  UDP + alpha-N-acetyl-D-glucosaminyl-(1->4)-beta-D-glucuronosyl-(1->3)-beta-D-galactosyl-(1->3)-beta-D-galactosyl-(1->4)-beta-D-xylosyl-proteoglycan

This enzyme is involved in the initiation of heparin and heparan sulfate synthesis.

References

External links 
 

EC 2.4.1